Stocklinch is a village and civil parish  north-east of Ilminster in the South Somerset district of Somerset, England.

History

The village is one Somerset's nine Thankful Villages (from a total of 52 villages in England and Wales), in which all the men who served in World War I came home, and one of only 14 doubly thankful villages in the country as it also did not lose any soldiers in World War II.

Governance

The parish council has responsibility for local issues, including setting an annual precept (local rate) to cover the council's operating costs and producing annual accounts for public scrutiny. The parish council evaluates local planning applications and works with the local police, district council officers, and neighbourhood watch groups on matters of crime, security, and traffic. The parish council's role also includes initiating projects for the maintenance and repair of parish facilities, as well as consulting with the district council on the maintenance, repair, and improvement of highways, drainage, footpaths, public transport, and street cleaning. Conservation matters (including trees and listed buildings) and environmental issues are also the responsibility of the council.

The village falls within the Non-metropolitan district of South Somerset, which was formed on 1 April 1974 under the Local Government Act 1972, having previously been part of Chard Rural District. The district council is responsible for local planning and building control, local roads, council housing, environmental health, markets and fairs, refuse collection and recycling, cemeteries and crematoria, leisure services, parks, and tourism.

Somerset County Council is responsible for running the largest and most expensive local services such as education, social services, libraries, main roads, public transport, policing and fire services, trading standards, waste disposal and strategic planning.

It is also part of the Somerton & Frome county constituency represented in the House of Commons of the Parliament of the United Kingdom. It elects one member of parliament by the first past the post system of election.

Religious sites

The Church of St Mary Magdalene dates from the 13th century and has been designated by English Heritage as a Grade I listed building, while the Church of St Mary the Virgin, which is of the same vintage, is Grade II* listed. In 1931 the two parishes they served, Stocklinch Ottersey and Stocklinch Magdalen, were combined into one parish.

References

External links

 Stocklinch village website
 Medieval houses of Stocklinch

Villages in South Somerset
Civil parishes in Somerset